The Premier of Dominica was responsible for chairing Cabinet meetings in Dominica following the passage of the West Indies Associated States Act. Under this act, the Cabinet had responsibility for domestic affairs, while foreign affairs were determined out of London.

The only two people to have held the post were Edward Oliver LeBlanc and Patrick John.  The position of Premier was succeeded by that of Prime Minister upon Dominica's Independence, on 3 November 1978.

List of premiers of Dominica

See also
List of heads of government of Dominica

History of British Dominica